Herman Li (born 3 October 1976) is a Hong Kong-born British musician who is one of two lead guitarists for the power metal band DragonForce. Li has played with the band based in England since it was formed in 1999 by Li along with Sam Totman, both of whom are also the remaining original members of the band. Before DragonForce he was in the black metal band Demoniac.

Early life
Herman Li was born on 3 October 1976 in Hong Kong and moved to France, then to England during his teenage years. He speaks English, French and Cantonese fluently.

Playing style
Li draws influences from rock, all subgenres of metal as well as video game music and often mimics sounds from popular retro games from the late 1980s, early 1990s arcade, and PC games. His playing style consists of fast descending and ascending legato and staccato licks, exotic scale runs, making extensive use of the harmonic minor and Phrygian dominant scale, extreme use of his whammy bar, quick full ascending and descending sweep picking arpeggios, alternate picking and two-handed tapping on the higher frets as well as incorporating many other shred guitar style techniques. Recently, he has started to use a device called the Hot Hand that sits on his right hand like a ring, which causes extreme vibrato when shaken, giving him a greater capacity to emulate certain video game sounds. Li has stated Joe Satriani, Steve Vai and Tony MacAlpine guitar playing heavily inspired his own style. Li is left-handed, but plays guitar right-handed.

Equipment

Guitars

Li uses Ibanez E-Gen guitars, his signature Ibanez models based on his old Ibanez S Series, which was retired from stage at the end of the Inhuman Rampage tour. The EGEN18 has a "Transparent Violet Flat" finish (transparent purple on a flamed-maple top), and the EGEN8 has a "Platinum Blonde" finish (natural wood finish with a flamed-maple top). Both have a rosewood fingerboard and gold hardware. The E-Gen model has many unique features and improvements over a standard S, including its versatile tone selection with coil tap switching for both the bridge and neck pickups, Edge Zero bridge (the EGEN8 has Edge III), custom DiMarzio HLM pickups (the EGEN8 has Ibanez pickups) and an extended scoop on the lower horn of the body, as well as a "Kung-Fu grip" on the upper horn shaped by Li's hand. It is currently Ibanez's flagship model for S body style guitars.

On 9 May 2010 Li announced via Facebook that he had received a custom-made Ibanez 7-string guitar. No details are known yet about this guitar, other than it has seven strings, and it is unknown whether it will be mass-produced for his E-Gen signature line.

Before the E-Gen, he had been known to play Ibanez S Prestige guitars. An Ibanez S470SOL (Japanese build 1995), a seven string Ibanez 540S7 (Japanese build 1991) (used in Revolution Deathsquad, Storming the Burning Fields, before the second verse and in the outro of Heartbreak Armageddon and the bridge section of Operation Ground and Pound), and an Ibanez S540FMTTS (Japanese build 1995). He has also been seen playing an Ibanez S2170FB and an Ibanez S2170FW. He also owns an Ibanez Jem7BSB, which has been used on every DragonForce album for recording rhythm guitar parts, an Ibanez J Custom RG, an Ibanez RG2228 (8-string model), and a PRS Modern Eagle, which he received as a gift from Paul Reed Smith and can be seen in the studio.

Amplifiers and effects
Li is currently building a brand new rig, as stated on his official website.

Li uses a Kemper Profiler as his primary amplifier.

Popular culture
Li and fellow band member Sam Totman are featured as performing twin guitar solos of the power metal song "Through the Fire and Flames" which has appeared in several video games. In the Guitar Hero rhythm game series, the song first featured in Guitar Hero III: Legends of Rock as an unlockable bonus song, and later appeared in Guitar Hero Smash Hits and Guitar Hero Live, as well as Rock Band 3 as DLC. The song also featured in Rocksmith 2014.

Notable awards and achievements
Li has won and featured in the following awards:

RIAA Certified Platinum Single "Through the Fire and Flames"
RIAA Certified Gold Record "Inhuman Rampage"
UK Silver Record "Inhuman Rampage"
Music Radar/Total Guitar 2017 – Best Metal Guitarists in the World
Metal Hammer Golden Gods 2009 – Best Shredder Award
Grammy Awards 2009 – Best Metal Performance "Heroes of Our Time" Nomination
Guitar World Reader's Poll 2007 – Best New Talent (winning by 70%)
Guitar World Reader's Poll 2007 – Best Metal
Guitar World Reader's Poll 2007 – Best Riff
Total Guitar Reader's Poll 2007 – Best Solo "Through the Fire and Flames"
Terrorizer Reader's Poll 2006 – Best Band "DragonForce"
Terrorizer Reader's Poll 2006 – Best Musician "Herman Li"
Terrorizer Reader's Poll 2006 – Best Live Act "DragonForce"
Metal Hammer Golden Gods 2005 – Best Shredder Award
Guitar World Magazine – 50 fastest guitarists

Notes

External links

Li's profile at the official DragonForce website
Li's Twitch streaming channel

1976 births
Living people
English heavy metal guitarists
English record producers
DragonForce members
Hong Kong emigrants to England
Hong Kong guitarists
Hong Kong record producers
Lead guitarists
Naturalised citizens of the United Kingdom
Twitch (service) streamers
Music YouTubers
English YouTubers